The 2016–17 Central Michigan Chippewas women's basketball team represents Western Michigan University during the 2016–17 NCAA Division I women's basketball season. The Broncos, led by fifth year head coach Shane Clipfell, play their home games at University Arena as members of the West Division of the Mid-American Conference.

Roster

Schedule
Source: 

|-
!colspan=9 style=""| Exhibition

|-
!colspan=9 style=""| Non-conference regular season

|-
!colspan=9 style=""| MAC regular season

|-
!colspan=9 style=""| MAC Tournament

See also
 2016–17 Western Michigan Broncos men's basketball team

References

Western Michigan
Western Michigan Broncos women's basketball seasons